John Augustus Sullivan (August 1798 – 1871) was Secretary for Demerara and Provost Marshal General of Jamaica.

He was the son of John Sullivan (1749–1839) of Richings Park, Buckinghamshire.
He owned Highgate House.

See also
 John Sullivan (British governor)

References

External links 

1798 births
1871 deaths